The Taiyuan Asian Puppet Theatre Museum was a museum of puppet theatre in Datong District, Taipei, Taiwan. It aimed to preserve and promote traditional Asian puppet culture and to foster interaction between local and international puppet troupes.

History
The museum was originally established in 2000 as the TTT Puppet Centre. It was then renamed as the Lin Liu-hsin Puppet Theatre Museum in November 2005 before it was known as its current name. On 1 July 2019, the museum closed down.

Exhibitions
It housed more than 10,000 puppet theater items from around the world, including glove, shadow, string and water puppets.

Transportation
The museum was accessible within walking distance north of Beimen Station of Taipei Metro.

See also
 List of museums in Taiwan

References

External links
 

2005 establishments in Taiwan
2019 disestablishments in Taiwan
Former buildings and structures in Taiwan
Museums disestablished in 2019
Museums established in 2005
Museums in Taipei
Defunct museums
Puppet museums in Taiwan
Theatre museums in Taiwan